Strangers in the Night is a 1944 American film noir mystery film directed by Anthony Mann and starring William Terry, Virginia Grey and Helene Thimig.

Plot
Sgt. Johnny Meadows is seriously wounded in battle in the South Pacific during World War Two. While recuperating, he takes comfort reading a book donated to the Red Cross by Rosemary Blake, who has written her name and address inside. He corresponds with her, and as pen pals they fall in love. Back in the States after being discharged, Johnny is aboard a train headed to the town in which Rosemary lives when he meets a pretty woman who happens to be reading the same book. For a moment, Johnny thinks perhaps she is Rosemary, but she is Dr. Leslie Ross. She is on her way to the same town where she is taking over another doctor's practice. Unbeknownst to Johnny, she has already met Rosemary's mother.

Johnny and Leslie have a pleasant time together and, just as he begins asking her if she happens to know Rosemary Blake, several train cars ahead of them derail.  Johnny assists the doctor as she cares for the injured.  Afterwards, they share a cab into town.

The next day, as the doctor settles into her practice, Johnny drives up the high hill to the house where Rosemary lives. He meets the homeowner, Rosemary's mother, who is an older disabled woman, and her live-in assistant, Ivy Miller. Mrs. Blake and Miller tell Johnny that Rosemary is away, but will be back soon, and Mrs. Blake invites him to stay. The next day Mrs. Blake shows Johnny a large portrait of Rosemary, so he can see how beautiful she is. Johnny agrees that she is lovely and, from the style in which the painting is done, he believes he knows the artist although he cannot remember his name.

After a few days of Rosemary not showing up, and no satisfactory answers forthcoming from either Mrs. Blake or Miller, who seems very nervous about the situation, Johnny leaves for San Francisco. He has recalled the artist's name and that he had for a short time worked with him in the city before the war. Meanwhile, Miller attempts to divulge to Dr. Ross just what is going on, but her nervousness and insecurities stop her. Dr. Ross and her nurse suspect something strange is going on in the Blake house, but because Mrs. Blake had been dismissive of the doctor during an initial consultation on her first day in town, they take no specific action.

After discovering what Miller has tried to do, Mrs. Blake gives her an overdose of medicine to kill her. A few moments later, Dr. Ross shows up at the home to see how Miller is doing, and then Johnny shows up too. He has found out that the painting is a ‘fantasy’ of what Mrs. Blake pictured as a perfect daughter. She admits to the ruse, explaining that she could not have children but always wanted a daughter so she could be loved. It was she who wrote the letters to Johnny. She asks for forgiveness and the couple announce that they are going to be married. Mrs. Blake suggests they share a celebratory drink. Johnny insists Miller should join them and runs upstairs to get her. He finds her unconscious; Dr. Ross can do nothing to revive her.

Mrs. Blake accuses the doctor of malpractice, but the doctor tells her the medicine she had prescribed for Miller wasn’t sufficient to kill her. Then Dr. Ross suggests Miller was murdered, but Mrs. Blake says it was suicide, that Miller has left a note. Johnny and the doctor ask to see it, and Mrs. Blake leaves them to fetch it. She instead goes out to their car to set a booby-trap. She returns without the note, and sends them away. They leave, and Johnny is almost killed tripping over the rope that Mrs. Blake has tied to their car as part of her trap. Dr. Ross realizes what has happened, and they feign their deaths by screaming aloud. Hearing this, Mrs. Blake telephones for an ambulance, but then Johnny and the doctor walk into the room, and the game is up. Mrs. Blake turns to the portrait of the imaginary Rosemary and cries out to it for help, and the portrait in its heavy frame falls off the wall and kills her.

Cast
 William Terry as Sgt. Johnny Meadows
 Virginia Grey as Dr. Leslie Ross
 Helene Thimig as Mrs. Hilda Blake
 Edith Barrett as Ivy Miller
 Anne O'Neal as Nurse Thompson
 Audley Anderson as Train Conductor
 Charles Sullivan as Police Driver
 Frances Morris as Nurse
 George Sherwood as Navy Doctor

Reception

Critical response
Film historian Spencer Selby called the film an "Eerie low-budget melodrama evincing several early noir elements of plot and style.

When the Blu-ray edition was released, film historian and critic Glenn Erickson discussed the background of the team that produced the film, "It's [Anthony Mann's] fifth film feature and his first that can be classified as at least partially noir. Compared to Joseph H. Lewis's My Name Is Julia Ross (a mini-masterpiece) or William Castle's When Strangers Marry (strained but quirky), 1944's Strangers in the Night is nobody's idea of great filmmaking. But in Olive Films' flawless Blu-ray edition, it's an excellent candidate for study ... Strangers in the Night's story credit points to Philip MacDonald, a screenwriter on the classic mysteries Rebecca, The Dark Past and Val Lewton's The Body Snatcher. The co-screenwriter Paul Gangelin has impressive credits as well, and contributes some natural-sounding dialogue."

References

External links
 
 
 
 
 Strangers in the Night information site and DVD review at DVD Beaver (includes images)

1944 films
1940s mystery thriller films
American mystery thriller films
American black-and-white films
1940s English-language films
Film noir
Films directed by Anthony Mann
Films set in California
Republic Pictures films
1940s American films